George Gleason was a member of the Wisconsin State Assembly during the 1876 session. Additionally, he was Supervisor and Assessor of Lima, Rock County, Wisconsin. He was a Republican. Gleason was born on November 11, 1810, in Farmington, Connecticut.

References

People from Farmington, Connecticut
People from Rock County, Wisconsin
Wisconsin city council members
1810 births
Year of death missing
Republican Party members of the Wisconsin State Assembly